Wild Bay is a natural bay on the coast of Labrador in the province of Newfoundland and Labrador, Canada. It lies within the southern reaches of Bonavista Bay, adjoining Monk Bay to the south.

References

Bays of Newfoundland and Labrador